Daniel Sharp or Sharpe may refer to:

Daniel Sharp (clergyman) (1783–1853), American clergyman
Daniel Sharp (swimmer) (born 1987), New Zealander Paralympian 
Daniel Sharpe, geologist